Wesley Michael Bizilia (September 9, 1936 – March 23, 2011) was an American basketball coach who served as head coach of the Troy State Trojans from 1973–1982. He was the fourth coach in the history of the Troy basketball program and accumulated a record of 102–129 in his nine seasons as head coach.

Bizilia died from cancer, aged 74.

References

1936 births
2011 deaths
American men's basketball coaches
Auburn Tigers men's basketball coaches
Basketball coaches from Pennsylvania
Deaths from cancer in Alabama
High school basketball coaches in the United States
People from Sayre, Pennsylvania
Troy Trojans men's basketball coaches
West Alabama Tigers men's basketball players